Olavi Rissanen (born 26 March 1947) is a Finnish footballer. He played in 39 matches for the Finland national football team from 1969 to 1979.

References

External links
 

1947 births
Living people
Finnish footballers
Finland international footballers
Place of birth missing (living people)
Association footballers not categorized by position